Dmitri Vyacheslavovich Polovinchuk (born 27 September 1982) is a former Russian footballer.

External links
  Player page on the official FC Shinnik Yaroslavl website
 

1982 births
Footballers from Moscow
Living people
Russian footballers
FC Dynamo Moscow players
FC Saturn Ramenskoye players
FC Shinnik Yaroslavl players
Russian Premier League players
Russian expatriate footballers
Expatriate footballers in Latvia
Russian expatriate sportspeople in Latvia
FC Daugava players
Association football defenders
FC Torpedo Vladimir players